Microbembex californica is a species of sand wasp in the family Crabronidae.

References

Crabronidae
Articles created by Qbugbot
Insects described in 1970